Molova is a rural locality (a village) in Yorgvinskoye Rural Settlement, Kudymkarsky District, Perm Krai, Russia. The population was 82 as of 2010.

Geography 
Molova is located 25 km north of Kudymkar (the district's administrative centre) by road. Kamashor is the nearest rural locality.

References 

Rural localities in Kudymkarsky District